A business opportunity (or bizopp) involves sale or lease of any product, service, equipment, etc. that will enable the purchaser-licensee to begin a business. The licensor or seller of a business opportunity usually declares that it will secure or assist the buyer in finding a suitable location or provide the product to the purchaser-licensee. This is different from the sale of an independent business, in which there is no continued relationship required by the seller.

Eckhardt and Shane (2003)   argue that when taking the path of entrepreneurship, one of the most important indicators for future entrepreneurship is the skill of finding the business opportunity. This is seen as the lynchpin around which the promise of entrepreneurial venture is to be built. Shane and state that individuals must possess prior knowledge and the cognitive properties necessary to value such knowledge in order to identify the new opportunity. This normally allows a triggering of the opportunity which can then move forward to scoping and validation.

Concept 
A common type of business opportunity involves a company that sells bulk vending machines and promises to secure suitable locations for the machines. The purchaser is counting on the company to find locations where sales will be high enough to enable them to recoup their expenses and make a profit. Because of the many cases of fraudulent biz-ops in which companies have not followed through on their promises, or in which profits were much less than what the company led the investor to believe, governments closely regulate these operations.

In the United States, the Federal Trade Commission receives complaints and helps coordinate enforcement action against fraudulent business opportunities.

Makeup of a business opportunity 

A business opportunity consists of four elements all of which are to be present most often within the same domain or geographical location, before it can be claimed as a business opportunity. These four elements are:
 A need
 The means to fulfill the need
 A method to apply the means to fulfill the need and;
 A method to benefit

With any one of the elements missing, a business opportunity may be developed, by finding the missing element. A desirable characteristic is for the combination of elements to be unique. The more control an institution (or individual) has over the elements, the better they are positioned to exploit the opportunity and become a niche market leader.

References

External links

Investor Bulletin: Business Opportunity Fraud, State of Connecticut Department of Banking, July 1995.
Federal Business Opportunities Official federal government procurement opportunities allowing contractors to retrieve services posted by government buyers.